Yoon Chan may refer to:
 Yoon Chan (actor, born 1972)
 Yoon Chan (actor, born 1996)